Alloysius Uzoma Agu (born 12 July 1967 in Lagos) is a Nigerian former professional footballer who played as a goalkeeper. Their number one choice in the early nineties, he played 28 international matches for the Nigeria national team. He was the starting goalkeeper in the 1990 African Nations Cup where the team finished as runners-up and was brought to the 1994 FIFA World Cup and the 1994 African Nations Cup as a cover for Peter Rufai. Agu retired at the age of 30, after having spent most of his career in Africa. He has served as the goalkeeping coach for Enyimba and in April 2008 was named goalkeeper coach for the national team.

External links 

1967 births
Living people
Sportspeople from Lagos
Nigerian footballers
Association football goalkeepers
Nigeria international footballers
Nigeria under-20 international footballers
Africa Cup of Nations-winning players
1994 FIFA World Cup players
1990 African Cup of Nations players
1992 African Cup of Nations players
1994 African Cup of Nations players
Eredivisie players
Belgian Pro League players
Süper Lig players
NEPA Lagos players
ACB Lagos F.C. players
MVV Maastricht players
RFC Liège players
Kayserispor footballers
Nigerian football managers
Nigerian expatriate footballers
Nigerian expatriate sportspeople in the Netherlands
Expatriate footballers in the Netherlands
Nigerian expatriate sportspeople in Belgium
Expatriate footballers in Belgium
Nigerian expatriate sportspeople in Turkey
Expatriate footballers in Turkey